Tommy Deans (7 January 1922 – 30 December 2000) was a Scottish professional footballer who played as a full back.

Career
Born in Shieldhill, Falkirk, Deans played for Armadale Thistle, Clyde, Notts County and Boston United.

References

1922 births
2000 deaths
Scottish footballers
Armadale Thistle F.C. players
Clyde F.C. players
Notts County F.C. players
Boston United F.C. players
Scottish Football League players
English Football League players
Association football fullbacks
Scottish Football League representative players
Footballers from Falkirk (council area)
Scottish Junior Football Association players